is a quasi-national park on Honshū in Japan. It is rated a protected landscape (category V) according to the IUCN. The park includes the Yatsugatake Mountains and the surrounding lava plateaus: Tateshina plateau, Kirigamine, and Utsukushigahara. It straddles the border between Nagano and Yamanashi prefectures. Mount Aka is the highest point in the park at 2,899 m. The volcanoes of the Yatsugatake mountains erupted from the middle of the Fossa Magna (ja) and spread skirts of lava south, east and west. Lake Matsubara, Shirakoma Pond, and Lake Shirakaba attract tourists to the region for boating, skating, and camping. Utsukushigahara is a lava plateau at the northern end of the park and offers views of the Northern Alps. The extensive lava plateau of Kirigahara is popular for hiking. There are also a number of onsens in addition to the hotsprings at Tateshina. The park was designated a quasi-national in 1964.

Like all quasi-national parks in Japan, the park is managed by the prefectural government.

See also

List of national parks of Japan
Northern Yatsugatake Volcanic Group
Southern Yatsugatake Volcanic Group
Mountains:
 Mount Nyū
 Mount Tateshina
 Mount Yoko

References

National parks of Japan
Parks and gardens in Yamanashi Prefecture
Parks and gardens in Nagano Prefecture
Protected areas established in 1964